Woodland Park is an unincorporated community in Page County, Virginia.

References

Unincorporated communities in Virginia
Unincorporated communities in Page County, Virginia